Nasry Juan Asfura Zablah (born 8 June 1958), also known as Tito Asfura, is a Honduran politician. He served as a deputy of the National Congress of Honduras representing the Francisco Morazán department on behalf of the National Party,  and served as the mayor of the Honduran capital, Tegucigalpa, from 2014 until 2022. He was succeeded as mayor by Jorge Aldana.

Asfura was included in the 2020 Sachamama list of the 100 most influential Latinos, a list that several international organizations have endorsed.

Early life
Asfura was born to Palestinians who immigrated to Central America during the Arab-Israeli conflict in the 1940s. He studied civil engineering at university but quit his course before being awarded his degree in order to embark on a career in the construction industry. His entry into public life came in the 1990s.

Corruption allegations
In 2020, Asfura was indicted by the Honduran authorities on charges of embezzling public funds and money laundering. He was accused of misappropriating more than 28 million lempiras for his personal benefit. The judiciary seized nine real estate properties and three businesses belonging to him. However, all the charges against him were dismissed.

In early October 2021, Asfura was listed in the Pandora Papers.

2021 Honduran presidential campaign

Asfura was chosen as the 2021 presidential candidate for the incumbent National Party. At the beginning of the campaign, polls indicated a tight race between Asfura and his left-wing opponent, Xiomara Castro, the leader of LIBRE and the wife of the former president Manuel Zelaya, but she went on to win the election by a comfortable margin.

References

1958 births
Living people
Honduran people of Palestinian descent
Deputies of the National Congress of Honduras
National Party of Honduras politicians
People from Francisco Morazán Department
Universidad Nacional Autónoma de Honduras alumni
People named in the Pandora Papers